Artôt is a surname. Notable people with this name include:

 Désirée Artôt (1835–1907), opera singer
  (1803–1887), Belgian horn player
 Alexandre Artôt (1815–1845), Belgian violinist
 Lola Artôt de Padilla (1876–1933), French soprano